Daniel Gideon Mazer (born 4 October 1971) is a British screenwriter, producer, and comedian. Mazer is best known as the long-time writing and production partner of comedian Sacha Baron Cohen and worked with him on his three unorthodox characters Ali G, Borat, and Brüno. He also co-wrote and co-produced the films based on Baron Cohen's characters such as Ali G Indahouse, Borat, and Brüno.

Early life
Mazer attended The Haberdashers' Aske's Boys' School, where he met Baron Cohen. He went on to read Law at Peterhouse, Cambridge University, and graduated in 1994. He was an active member of Cambridge Footlights while at university and was vice president from 1993 to 1994.

Career
His early work includes production roles on The Word, The Big Breakfast and The 11 O'Clock Show.

In 2007 he was nominated for the Academy Award for Best Adapted Screenplay for co-writing the film Borat: Cultural Learnings of America for Make Benefit Glorious Nation of Kazakhstan. He shared his nomination with Sacha Baron Cohen, Ant Hines, Peter Baynham, and Todd Phillips. They ended up losing to The Departed.

In 2013 he made his feature film directing debut with the British comedy I Give It a Year. He followed it with the 2016 American comedy Dirty Grandpa.

In 2020 he co-wrote the script for Borat Subsequent Moviefilm, for which he was again nominated for the Academy Award for Best Adapted Screenplay and also won a Writers Guild Award.

Personal life
He is married to television personality Daisy Donovan, with whom he has two daughters, Maisy and Mini Ivy.

Mazer is Jewish.

Filmography

References

External links

 Agency page at United Agents

 "Win no friends and influence nobody" (The Observer, 4 March 2007) – Mazer writes about his Academy Award nomination experience

1971 births
Living people
Alumni of Peterhouse, Cambridge
British comedians
British Jews
British male screenwriters
Comedy film directors
Film directors from London
People educated at Haberdashers' Boys' School
Writers from London